The 2014 French Road Cycling Cup is the 23rd edition of the French Road Cycling Cup.

Compared to the previous edition, the same races are to be held, with the only change the Tour de la Somme, which moved from September to early May. The defending champion from the last two seasons was Samuel Dumoulin and is succeeded by Julien Simon, who clinched the title on September 21 after the Grand Prix d'Isbergues when he obtained a 64-point lead over Dumoulin, with only 50 points left to earn.

Events

Final Points standings

Individual
In order to be eligible for the classification, riders either had to be French or competed for a French-licensed team.

Young rider classification
In order to be eligible for the classification, riders had to be younger than 25 and either had to be French or competed for a French-licensed team.

Teams
Only French teams are eligible to be classified in the teams classification.

External links
  Official website

French Road Cycling Cup
French Road Cycling Cup
2014 in French sport